Founded in 1973, the Evangelical Christian Academy (ECA) is an international Christian school in Camarma de Esteruelas, Province of Madrid, Spain.

ECA offers 1st through 12th grades to students of Christian workers, as well as to international and national students.

Core Values 
ECA offers a college-preparatory curriculum in an American-based system. Students at ECA study Bible each year, and a Christian worldview is integrated into every aspect of the curriculum.

Accreditation 
ECA is currently accredited with the Association of Christian Schools International (ACSI).

References

External links 

 

Schools in Madrid
Nondenominational Christian schools
Christian schools in Spain
International schools in Spain